Evangelia Aravani (: born 29 November 1985) is a Greek fashion model and TV presenter. In 2005, Aravani won the title of Miss Star Hellas and then was chosen to represent Greece at the Miss Universe 2005 pageant where she placed 11th. In 2006, Aravani continued to pursue a modeling career and appeared on the covers of numerous fashion magazines.
Aravani was a special guest at the official Cypriot beauty contest, whose winners go on to represent Cyprus at the Miss Universe and Miss World pageants. She co-presented alongside singer Sakis Rouvas the fourth and fifth seasons of singing reality television competition X-Factor in Greece and continued her career by presenting the fashion competition My Style Rocks and the non-profit dancing competition Dancing with the Stars. From 2018 to 2019 presented the Greek version Project Runway.

Filmography

References

External links

Ace Models
EastWest Models

1985 births
Greek beauty pageant winners
Greek female models
Living people
Miss Universe 2005 contestants
People from Lefkada